El Fraile, Cerro del Fraile, Cerro de los Frailes or Pico del los Frailes is the highest peak in the coastal range of the Sierra del Cabo de Gata in the Cabo de Gata-Níjar Natural Park.

Like the rest of the range the peak is of volcanic origin. The last eruption dates about 8 million years ago.

The summit can be reached by a cross-country hike.

Culture 
In El Fraile was shot western films like Sugar Colt (1966) and The Good, the Bad and the Ugly (1966).

References 

Penibaetic System
Mountains of Andalusia
Volcanism of Spain
Miocene volcanism
Cabo de Gata-Níjar Natural Park